Abdel Mohsin Al-Qattan (5 November 1929 - 4 December 2017) was a Palestinian businessman and politician.

Al-Qattan was born on 5 November 1929 in Jaffa. He was educated at Ayyubid School in Jaffa, followed by An-Nahda College in Jerusalem. In 1947, he enrolled at the American University of Beirut and earned a degree in business studies.

In 1993, he founded the A. M. Qattan Foundation, a not-for-profit developmental organisation based in Ramallah. The chairman is his son Omar Al-Qattan.

In June 2018, the Foundation opened a $21 million headquarters building and arts centre in Ramallah.

References

1929 births
2017 deaths
Palestinian businesspeople
American University of Beirut alumni